List of maritime museums in the United States is a sortable list of American museums which display objects related to ships and water travel.  Many of these maritime museums have museum ships in their collections.  Member museums of the Council of American Maritime Museums (CAMM) are indicated in the last column.

Museum ships not affiliated with a museum appear on a separate list of museum ships.

Table

See also
U.S. Navy museums

References
 
 
 
 
 
 
 

Maritime